Richard Boucher (born 1951) is an American diplomat.

Richard or Dick Boucher may also refer to:
 Richard Boucher (footballer) (1932–2017), French soccer defender
 Dick Boucher, participant for Rhodesia in the 1976 World Outdoor Bowls Championship

See also
Rick Boucher (Frederick Carlyle Boucher, born 1946), member of the U.S. House of Representatives